The 1994–95 Rugby League Divisional Premiership  was the 9th end-of-season Rugby League Divisional Premiership competition and the last in the winter era.

The competition was contested by the top eight teams in the second Division. The winners were Keighley Cougars.

First round

Semi-finals

Final

See also
 1994–95 Rugby Football League season

Notes

References
 

Rugby League Divisional Premiership